The 1898 Denver Pioneers football team was an American football team that represented the University of Denver as an independent during the 1898 college football season. The team compiled a 6–4–1 record and was outscored by a total of 121 to 78. The team's Thanksgiving Day victory over Wyoming was the program's first game against an opponent from outside the State of Colorado.

Schedule

References

Denver
Denver Pioneers football seasons
Denver Pioneers football